Jannik Bruhns (born 14 May 1999) is a German footballer who plays as a goalkeeper.

References

External links
 Profile at FuPa.net

1999 births
Living people
German footballers
Association football goalkeepers
SC Fortuna Köln players
3. Liga players